The 1991 Segunda División Peruana, the second division of Peruvian football (soccer), was played by 10 teams. The tournament winner, Enrique Lau Chun.

Results

Standings

External links
 RSSSF

Peruvian Segunda División seasons
Peru2
2